Ambrose Curtis (born 17 April 1992) is a New Zealand rugby union player who currently plays as a winger for  in the Mitre 10 Cup.

Career

Curtis made his Wellington debut in 2012 against  and went on to establish himself as a regular starter and try-scorer for the Lions over the next 2 seasons. Despite a substandard showing by his province in 2014 in which they were relegated from the ITM Cup Premiership, Curtis's own form was strong.

In May 2018, it was announced that Curtis Ambrose had signed for Gallagher Premiership team Wasps.

International career

Curtis was a member of the New Zealand Under-20 side which competed in the 2012 IRB Junior World Championship in South Africa and was also a regular member of the All Blacks sevens side during the 2013 and 2014 seasons.

References

External links 
 

1992 births
Living people
New Zealand rugby union players
Rugby union wings
Wellington rugby union players
Manawatu rugby union players
Male rugby sevens players
People educated at Wellington College (New Zealand)